Blepharocarya involucrigera is a tree in the sumac family Anacardiaceae. It is endemic to Queensland, Australia. Common names include north Queensland bollygum, northern bollygum and rose butternut.

Description
Blepharocarya involucrigera grows best in well developed rainforest, where it can reach 40m in height with a dense rounded canopy, but in marginal habitats it may only reach 15m.
The leaves are compound with 10 to 18 opposite leaflets, up to 15 cm long and up to 4.5 cm wide, elliptic to ovate in shape. Mature leaves are dark green above and paler beneath, while new growth is a rosey red.
Above the basal pair of leaflets the rachis is flattened on the upper surface with angular edges (tending to winged).

Range and Habitat
This species grows in rainforest, monsoon forest and vine thickets from the Torres Strait islands and Cape York Peninsula south to the Atherton Tablelands, and from sea level to 800m.

Flowers and Fruits
Large terminal panicles of small, pale green to white flowers appear in the spring.
This species is dioecious, that is, male and female flowers appear on separate plants.
Fruits are small and flattened, around 4mm x 8mm, surrounded by small hairs on the marginal edge.
They are enclosed within a green, fibrous involucre, which dries and opens to release the fruit, becoming brown and woody in the process.
The dry involucres may persist on the tree for some time and are often found on the ground underneath mature trees.
This very distinctive fruit and the flattened rachis make easily recognisable key identifiers for the species.

Taxonomy and Naming
The species was formally described in 1878 by Victorian Government botanist Ferdinand von Mueller in the 11th volume of his Fragmenta Phytographiae Australiae based on plant material collected near the Endeavour River in north-east Queensland. The name Blepharocarya comes from the Ancient Greek blepharon (eyelid), and carya (nut) which refers to the fruit having hairs around the margin and resembling an eyelid. The specific epithet comes from the Latin involucrum (a whorl of bracts around flowers or fruit), and gero (bearing or borne on).

Toxicity
As with many other plants in the Anacardiaceae family, contact with the resin or other parts of the tree can cause severe allergic reactions including dermatitis, conjunctivitis, and headaches. Individuals may become increasingly sensitised to contact with any part of the tree.

Uses
The tree produces a decorative timber that has been used for cabinetmaking, flooring and cooperage. Fruits are eaten by Double-eyed Fig Parrots and King Parrots

Gallery

References

Anacardiaceae
Trees of Australia
Taxa named by Ferdinand von Mueller
Endemic flora of Queensland
Taxa described in 1878